Bacent Othman (born August 23, 1977, is an Egyptian table tennis player. She represented Egypt in 2000 Summer Olympics in Sydney, where she competed in women's doubles event in table tennis competition.

Olympic participation

Sydney 2000

Group stage – Group H

Final Standing: 25T

References

1977 births
Living people
Egyptian female table tennis players
Table tennis players at the 2000 Summer Olympics
Olympic table tennis players of Egypt